Shimon Mizrahi (born October 16, 1939, Tel Aviv) is an Israeli lawyer and the chairman of the Maccabi Tel Aviv Basketball Club.

Biography

Professional career
Mizrahi is the senior partner in the B. Arnon – S. Mizrahi law office, and specializes in traffic violation cases. In 2006, he defended the prominent attorney Dori Klagsbald, in a high-profile case of manslaughter, following the death of two, a mother and child, that were killed by Klagsbald's vehicle.

Maccabi Tel Aviv
Mizrahi was appointed the chairman of the Maccabi Tel Aviv basketball club in 1969. In the wake of the club's financial problems, he introduced various strategies to rescue Maccabi from bankruptcy, such as selling tickets for Maccabi games, which had previously been free. Mizrahi realized that in order to secure Maccabi's dominance in the Israeli Super League, it would have to sign American players.

Since he became the club's chairman in 1969, Maccabi has won 44 Israeli Super League championships, winning the league's title in all but seven seasons (1992–93, 2007–08, 2009–10, 2012–13, 2014–15, 2015–16, and 2016–17). The club has also won 36 Israeli State Cup and 7 Israeli League Cup titles during his tenure. The club also won the Adriatic League championship (2012), with Mizrahi running the club. However, Maccabi's main achievement during his time as the club's chairman, includes the winning of 6 top-tier level European-wide titles, as they won the EuroLeague championship 5 times (1977, 1981, 2004, 2005, and 2014), and also the FIBA SuproLeague championship (2001).

Mizrahi was at one time accused by rival clubs of failing to make the Israeli Super League more competitive, by having plans to implement payment limits to players. However, Mizrahi agreed to several new league rules which were meant to weaken Maccabi, such as the Brisker Rule, which limits the number of foreign players every team can sign, and the implementation of a Final Four format, instead of a best-of-five playoff series system, among other rule changes.

On 21 December 2021, Mizrahi was announced as a candidate for the Class of 2022 at the Basketball Hall of Fame.

Personal life
Mizrahi is Jewish.

Awards and accolades
In 2007, Mizrahi was chosen by Time magazine, as one of 50 best sport managers in the world.
In 2011, he was awarded the Israel Prize for sports, for his long-time contribution to Maccabi Tel Aviv. Although this award was contested, it was upheld by the Supreme Court of Israel.
In November 2018, Mizrahi was honored and announced as a EuroLeague Basketball Legend. He was the first EuroLeague Basketball Legend selected from the club executive level.

See also 
List of Israel Prize recipients

References

External links
  Resume of Shimon Mizrahi at Israel Prize website 

1939 births
Living people
Basketball executives
Israeli Jews
Israel Prize in sport recipients
Maccabi Tel Aviv B.C.
People from Tel Aviv